In knot theory, the Kauffman polynomial is a 2-variable knot polynomial due to Louis Kauffman. It is initially defined on a link diagram as

,

 (O is the unknot).

L is unchanged under type II and III Reidemeister moves.

Additionally L must satisfy Kauffman's skein relation:

The pictures represent the L polynomial of the diagrams which differ inside a disc as shown but are identical outside.

Kauffman showed that L exists and is a regular isotopy invariant of unoriented links.  It follows easily that F is an ambient isotopy invariant of oriented links.

The Jones polynomial is a special case of the Kauffman polynomial, as the L polynomial specializes to the bracket polynomial. The Kauffman polynomial is related to Chern–Simons gauge theories for SO(N) in the same way that the HOMFLY polynomial is related to Chern–Simons gauge theories for SU(N).

References

Further reading

External links
"Kauffman polynomial", Encyclopedia of Mathematics

Knot theory
Polynomials